There have been two ships in the German Imperial Navy named SMS Württemberg:

  - A  launched in 1878.
  -  A  launched in 1917, but never completed.

German Navy ship names